The 2006–07 Macedonian First League was the 15th season of the Macedonian First Football League, the highest football league of Macedonia. The first matches of the season were played on 6 August 2006 and the last on 27 May 2007. Rabotnichki were the defending champions, having won their second title. The 2006-07 champions were Pobeda who had won their second title.

Promotion and relegation

Participating teams

League table

Results 
Every team will play three times against each other team for a total of 33 matches. The first 22 matchdays will consist of a regular double round-robin schedule. The league standings at this point will then be used to determine the games for the last 11 matchdays.

Matches 1–22

Matches 23–33

Relegation playoff

Top goalscorers 

Source: Macedonian Football

See also
2006–07 Macedonian Football Cup
2006–07 Macedonian Second Football League

External links 
 Macedonia - List of final tables (RSSSF)
 Football Federation of Macedonia

Macedonia
1
2006-07